Zahle may refer to:

 Zahle (surname)
 Zahlé (transliterated Zahleh or Zahleh, زحلة), the capital of Beqaa Governorate, Lebanon
 Zahle and Forzol, a Melkite Catholic diocese in the Beqaa Valley, Lebanon
 Our Lady of Zahle and the Bekaa, a Marian shrine
 Centre d'Etudes Universitaires de Zahlé et de la Békaa (CEUZB), a university institution
 Anibal Zahle, a Lebanese sports club
 Zahle District

See also 
 Zahl (disambiguation)